{{DISPLAYTITLE:C8H15NO2}}
The molecular formula C8H15NO2 (molar mass: 157.21 g/mol, exact mass: 157.1103 u) may refer to:

 Oxanamide (Quiactin)
 Tranexamic acid (TXA)

Molecular formulas